David Thomas is the Chair of Biochemistry at McGill University in Montreal, Quebec, Canada. His research interests include cell signaling pathways and their role in infectious diseases and molecular chaperone systems in the endoplasmic reticulum.

References

External links
http://www.mcgill.ca/biochemistry/about-us/department/faculty-members/thomas

Living people
Year of birth missing (living people)
Place of birth missing (living people)
Academic staff of McGill University
Canadian biochemists
Alumni of University College London
Canadian geneticists
Scientists from Montreal